Frederico Perera (sometimes erroneously written as Frederick Perera) (1836 – 1909) was an English first-class cricketer.

The son of the Spaniard Augurio Perera and his wife, Francisca, he was born at Holborn in 1836. His father was a merchant who moved the family to Birmingham in the same year of his birth, where he took over a storehouse on Great Charles Street. In 1839, the family once more relocated, this time to Manchester. Perera made his debut in first-class cricket for Manchester against Surrey at Eccles in 1857. The following season, he made three appearances in first-class cricket, appearing twice for the Gentlemen of the North against the Gentlemen of the South, and once for Manchester against Sussex. He scored a total of 54 runs in his four first-class matches, at an average of 7.71 and a high score of 29. By profession, he too was a merchant. He died in 1909. His middle brother, Pedro, was also a first-class cricketer, while his eldest brother, Augurio, is credited as being the co-inventor of lawn tennis.

References

External links

1836 births
1909 deaths
People from Holborn
English people of Spanish descent
English cricketers
Manchester Cricket Club cricketers
Gentlemen of the North cricketers
English merchants
19th-century English businesspeople